Majed Qasheesh (born 4 December 2001) is a Saudi Arabian professional footballer who plays as a left back for Pro League side Al-Nassr.

Club career
Qasheesh began his career at the youth team of Al-Nassr. On 17 September 2022, he signed his first professional contract with the club. He made his debut on 15 September 2022 in the 4–0 win over Al-Batin.

Career statistics

Club

References

External links
 
 

2001 births
Living people
Association football fullbacks
Saudi Arabian footballers
Al Nassr FC players
Saudi Professional League players